James Alexander Seddon (July 13, 1815 – August 19, 1880) was an American lawyer and politician who served two terms as a Representative in the United States Congress, as a member of the Democratic Party. Seddon was appointed Confederate States Secretary of War by Jefferson Davis during the American Civil War.

Biography
Due to frail health, Seddon was educated primarily at home and became self-taught as a youth. At the age of twenty-one, he entered the law school of the University of Virginia. After graduation, Seddon settled in Richmond, Virginia, establishing a successful law practice.

In 1845, the Democratic Party nominated Seddon for Congress, and he was easily elected. He was renominated two years later but declined due to platform differences with the party. In 1849, Seddon was reelected to Congress, serving from December 1849 until March 1851. Owing to poor health, he declined another nomination at the end of his term. He retired to "Sabot Hill," his plantation located along the James River above Richmond.

Seddon attended the Peace Conference of 1861 held in Washington, D.C., which attempted to devise a means of preventing the impending civil war. Later in the same year, he attended the Provisional Congress of the Confederate States. President Davis named him his fourth Secretary of War, succeeding George W. Randolph. He held this post until January 1, 1865, when he retired from public life to his plantation and was succeeded by John C. Breckinridge. His service of more than twenty-four months as Secretary made him the most durable of the five secretaries.

Electoral history
1845; Seddon was elected to the U.S. House of Representatives with 52.28% of the vote, defeating Whig John Minor Botts.
1849; Seddon was reelected with 53.64% of the vote, defeating Whig challenger Botts.

External links

James Seddon biography at Spartacus Educational
James Seddon biography at the Confederate States War Department

|-

|-

1815 births
1880 deaths
Executive members of the Cabinet of the Confederate States of America
Deputies and delegates to the Provisional Congress of the Confederate States
People of Virginia in the American Civil War
University of Virginia School of Law alumni
Virginia lawyers
Democratic Party members of the United States House of Representatives from Virginia
19th-century American politicians
People from Falmouth, Cornwall
19th-century American lawyers